Huequenia araucana is a species of longhorn beetle in the Cerambycinae subfamily. It was described by Cerda in 1980. It is known from Chile.

References

Achrysonini
Beetles described in 1980
Endemic fauna of Chile